Sir Peter Hugh Jefferd Lloyd-Jones FBA (21 September 1922 – 5 October 2009) was a British classical scholar and Regius Professor of Greek at the University of Oxford.

Early life and education 
Lloyd-Jones was educated at Westminster School where he developed an interest in Modern History before being converted to Classics by his Headmaster, J. T. Christie. He pursued undergraduate and postgraduate studies at Christ Church, Oxford, but his studies were interrupted by the Second World War. In February 1942, he was one of a group consisting mostly of classicists from Oxford and Cambridge who were assigned to study Japanese at the secret Bedford Japanese School run by Captain Oswald Tuck RN. Lloyd-Jones was in the first course run at the school, which lasted for only five months. After Bedford he was sent to the Military Wing at Bletchley Park, and then he received further training at the Foreign Office and the Ministry of Economic Warfare. Subsequently he was posted to the Wireless Experimental Centre, Delhi, where he worked as an officer in the Intelligence Corps. According to Oswald Tuck’s account, these three were the ‘key men’ at the Wireless Experimental Centre. He was invited to join the British Commonwealth Occupation Force in Japan, but turned it down as he was eager to get back to his studies. He ended the War as a Captain.

Career 
Lloyd-Jones took a first degree in Greats in 1948 and gained several University prizes. For a while he was a Fellow of Jesus College, Cambridge, and while there met his first wife, Frances Hedley, a Classics student at Newnham College, whom he married in 1953. The couple had two sons and a daughter and were divorced in 1981.  In 1951 Lloyd-Jones returned to Oxford where he became the first holder of the E. P. Warren Praelectorship at Corpus.

Lloyd-Jones supervised many distinguished D. Phil. students, including Martin Litchfield West. In his inaugural address as Regius Professor in 1961 he called for a reduction in the emphasis laid on composition taught to undergraduates and suggested that Honour Moderations might have to be reformed to encompass studies taken from ancient philosophy and history as well as the traditional literature and language.

He contributed editions of Menander's Dyscolus (1960) and of Sophocles (1990, together with Nigel Wilson) to the Oxford Classical Texts, and editions and translations of the Aeschylean fragments (1960) and of Sophocles (2000) to the Loeb Classical Library.

Lloyd-Jones was elected a Fellow of the British Academy in 1966 and was a member of five foreign academies, holding honorary doctorates from the universities of Chicago, Tel Aviv, Göttingen and Thessaloniki. He was a member of both the American Academy of Arts and Sciences and the American Philosophical Society. His retirement from the Regius Chair in 1989, after twenty-nine years, was marked by a knighthood.
 
He married his second wife Mary R. Lefkowitz, Professor Emerita of Classical Studies at Wellesley College in Massachusetts, in 1982, and spent his last 27 years at their home in Wellesley.

Major publications
Lloyd-Jones, Hugh, Blood for the Ghosts: Classical Influences in the Nineteenth and Twentieth Centuries (Baltimore: Johns Hopkins University Press, 1983)
 Classical Survivals: The Classics in the Modern World (London: Duckworth, 1982)
 Greek Comedy, Hellenistic Literature, Greek Religion, and Miscellanea: The Academic Papers of Sir Hugh Lloyd-Jones (Oxford: Oxford University Press, Clarendon Press, 1990)
 Greek Epic, Lyric, and Tragedy: The Academic Papers of Sir Hugh Lloyd Jones (Oxford: Oxford University Press, Clarendon Press, 1990)
 Greek in a Cold Climate (London: Duckworth, 1991)
 The Justice of Zeus (2nd ed. Sather Classical Lectures, no. 42. Berkeley: University of California Press, 1983)
 Mythical Beasts (London: Duckworth, 1980)
 Myths of the Zodiac (New York: St. Martin's, 1978)
Lloyd-Jones, Hugh, ed., Females of the Species: Semonides on Women (Park Ridge, NJ: Noyes, 1975)
Lloyd-Jones, Hugh, and Nigel Guy Wilson, Sophoclea: Studies on the Text of Sophocles (Oxford: Oxford University Press, Clarendon Press, 1990)
 Sophocles: Second Thoughts (Hypomnemata, no. 100. Götttingen : Vandenhoeck und Ruprecht, 1997)
Lloyd-Jones, Hugh, and Nigel Guy Wilson, eds., Sophoclis Fabulae, Scriptorum classicorum bibliotheca Oxoniensis (Oxford Classical Texts) (New York: Oxford University Press, 1990)

References

 

 
 
 

1922 births
2009 deaths
Alumni of Christ Church, Oxford
British Army personnel of World War II
British classical philologists
British classical scholars
Fellows of the British Academy
Fellows of Corpus Christi College, Oxford
Fellows of Jesus College, Cambridge
Scholars of ancient Greek literature
People educated at Westminster School, London
Knights Bachelor
Intelligence Corps officers
Members of the University of Cambridge faculty of classics
Regius Professors of Greek (University of Oxford)
Translators of Ancient Greek texts
20th-century translators
Members of the American Philosophical Society